El Sentinel del Sur de Florida (Spanish for "South Florida Sentinel") is a weekly Spanish-language newspaper published in Deerfield Beach, Florida by the South Florida Sun Sentinel Company, a subsidiary of Tribune Publishing of Chicago, which also publishes the South Florida Sun-Sentinel.  El Sentinel began publication on October 12, 2002.

The newspaper's main competitor in the South Florida metropolitan area is El Nuevo Herald, the Spanish edition of the Miami Herald.

Editorially, it has historically tilted conservative. El Sentinel covers all Florida and is mainly distributed in Palm Beach and Broward counties. 

Editor of El Sentinel is Yvonne H. Valdez.
Web page: ElSentinelSFL.com (https://www.sun-sentinel.com/espanol/)

See also
El Sentinel Orlando

External links
 

Newspapers published in Florida
Mass media in the Miami metropolitan area
Spanish-language newspapers published in Florida
Tribune Publishing
2003 establishments in Florida
Publications established in 2003